The Rural Municipality of Touchwood No. 248 is a rural municipality (RM) in the Canadian province of Saskatchewan within Census Division No. 10 and  Division No. 4.

History 
The RM of Touchwood No. 248 incorporated as a rural municipality on December 12, 1910.

Geography

Communities and localities 
The following unincorporated communities are within the RM.

Localities
 Arbury
 Magyar
 Serath
 South Touchwood
 Touchwood
 Zala

Demographics 

Attractions 
 Touchwood Hills Post Provincial Historic Park

Government 
The RM of Touchwood No. 248 is governed by an elected municipal council and an appointed administrator that meets on the second Tuesday of every month. The reeve of the RM is Ernest Matai while its administrator is Lorelei Paulsen. The RM's office is located in Punnichy.

Transportation 
 Saskatchewan Highway 6
 Saskatchewan Highway 15
 Saskatchewan Highway 640
 Saskatchewan Highway 731
 Canadian National Railway

See also 
List of rural municipalities in Saskatchewan

References 

Touchwood
Division No. 10, Saskatchewan